Vlado Milošević (1901–1990) was a Serbian composer and ethnomusicologist  from Banja Luka, Bosnia-Herzegovina. His hometown of Banja Luka holds an annual musical festival named after the composer.

He attended elementary school and gimnazija in Banja Luka. He studied history and geography in Belgrade, then in Zagreb, and finished his music (pedagogy) studies. He taught in Banja Luka and Niš, and subsequently worked at the Museum of Bosanska Krajina, and conducted the Serbian Singing Society (SPD) "Jedinstvo" ("Unity") choir.

Along with Draga Bukinac and Dragan Šajnović, in 1934, he co-founded the Music School in Banja Luka. In 1946, at the suggestion of Jaroslav Plecitiju, Milošević was named administrator of the music school he had co-founded a dozen years earlier. In 1953, he received his first major award, His first major award from the Union of Composers, for "Songs from Zmijanje", with 20,000 dinars. He was elected to the Academy of Arts and Sciences. That year, he gave a lecture "On the Musical Arts" for students and teachers of the Music School. It was his farewell to the institution but he continued to work with such colleagues as Mujo Karabegović and Marko Tajčević. Milošević's last years were spent in one of the villas in today's King Petar I Karađorđević Street, Banja Luka, which holds Milošević's memorial room.

Links
 Profile, riznicasrpska.net
 The Digitized Legacy of academician  Vlado Milošević 
 Gimnazija,  Banja Luka website
  Istaknute istorijske ličnosti Banjaluke (IV): Vlado Milošević - radni vijek posvećen muzici

1901 births
1990 deaths
Serbian composers
Serbian ethnomusicologists
People from Banja Luka
20th-century composers
20th-century musicologists